BBC Radio 4 is a British national radio station owned and operated by the BBC that replaced the BBC Home Service in 1967. It broadcasts a wide variety of spoken-word programmes, including news, drama, comedy, science and history from the BBC's headquarters at Broadcasting House, London. The station controller is Mohit Bakaya.

Broadcasting throughout the United Kingdom, the Isle of Man and the Channel Islands on FM, LW and DAB, and on BBC Sounds, it can be received in the eastern counties of Ireland, northern France and Northern Europe. It is available on Freeview, Sky, and Virgin Media. Radio 4 currently reaches over 10 million listeners, making it the UK's second most-popular radio station after Radio 2.

BBC Radio 4 broadcasts news programmes such as Today and The World at One, heralded on air by the Greenwich Time Signal pips or the chimes of Big Ben. The pips are only accurate on FM, LW, and MW; there is a delay on digital radio of three to five seconds and online up to twenty-three seconds. Radio 4 broadcasts the Shipping Forecast which, in August 2017, was 150 years old.

According to RAJAR, the station broadcasts to a weekly audience of 10.0 million with a listening share of 11.3% as of December 2022.

Overview
BBC Radio 4 is the second-most-popular British domestic radio station by total hours, after Radio 2. It recorded its highest audience, of 11 million listeners, in May 2011, and was "UK Radio Station of the Year" at the 2003, 2004 and 2008 Sony Radio Academy Awards. It also won a Peabody Award in 2002 for File on 4:  Export Controls. Costing £71.4 million (2005/6), it is the BBC's most expensive national radio network and is considered by many to be its flagship. There is no comparable British commercial network: Channel 4 abandoned plans to launch its own speech-based digital radio station in October 2008 as part of a £100m cost cutting review.

In 2019, Mohit Bakaya replaced Gwyneth Williams, who had been the station controller since 2010.

Music is broadcast as in documentaries relating to various forms of both popular and classical music, and the long-running music-based Desert Island Discs. Following the creation of BBC Radio 5 Live in 1994, the station has become the home of ball-by-ball commentaries of most Test cricket matches played by England. The coverage is broadcast on long wave. Consequently, for around 70 days a year, listeners have to rely on FM broadcasts or DAB for mainstream Radio 4 broadcasts – the number relying solely on long wave is now a small minority. The cricket broadcasts take precedence over on-the-hour news bulletins, but not the Shipping Forecast, carried since Radio 4's move to long wave in 1978 because long wave can be received clearly at sea.

The station has a strong reputation for news, drama, and comedy. Following the Six O'Clock News from Monday to Friday, the station normally broadcasts a thirty-minute comedy programme.

The station is available on FM in most of Great Britain, parts of Ireland and the north of France; LW throughout the UK and in parts of Northern Europe, and the Atlantic north of the Azores to about 20 degrees west; MW in some areas; DAB; Digital TV including Freeview, Freesat, Sky and Virgin Media, and on the Internet. Freesat, Sky and Virgin have a separate channel for Radio 4 LW output in mono, in addition to the FM output.

The longwave signal is part of the Royal Navy's system of letters of last resort. In the event of a suspected catastrophic attack on Britain, submarine captains, in addition to other checks, check for a broadcast signal from Radio 4 on 198 longwave to verify the annihilation of organised society in Great Britain.

History 

The BBC Home Service was the predecessor of Radio 4 and broadcast between 1939 and 1967. It had regional variations and was broadcast on medium wave with a network of VHF FM transmitters being added from 1955. Radio 4 replaced it on 30 September 1967, when the BBC restructured and renamed its domestic radio stations, in response to the challenge of offshore radio. It moved to long wave in November 1978, taking over the 200 kHz frequency (1,500 metres) previously held by Radio 2 - later moved to 198 kHz as a result of international agreements aimed at avoiding interference (all ITU Region 1 MW/LW broadcast frequencies are divisible by 9). At this point, Radio 4 became available across all of the UK for the first time and the station officially became known as Radio 4 UK, a title that remained until 29 September 1984.

For a time during the 1970s Radio 4 carried regional news bulletins Monday to Saturday. These were broadcast twice at breakfast, at lunchtime and at 17:55. There were also programme variations for the parts of England not served by BBC Local Radio stations. These included Roundabout East Anglia, a VHF opt-out of the Today programme broadcast from BBC East's studios in Norwich each weekday from 6.45 a.m. to 8.45 a.m. Roundabout East Anglia came to an end in August 1980, ahead of the launch of BBC Radio Norfolk.

All regional news bulletins broadcast from BBC regional news bases around England ended in August 1980, apart from in the southwest as until January 1983 there was no BBC Local Radio in the southwest so these news bulletins and its weekday morning regional programme, Morning Sou'West, continued to be broadcast from the BBC studios in Plymouth on VHF and on the Radio 4 medium wave Plymouth relay until 31 December 1982.

The launch of Radio 5 on 27 August 1990 saw the removal of Open University, schools programming, children's programmes and the Study on 4/Options adult education slot from Radio 4's FM frequencies. Consequently, the full Radio 4 schedule became available on FM for the first time. However, adult educational and Open University programming returned to Radio 4 in 1994 when Radio 5 was closed to make way for the launch of BBC Radio 5 Live and were broadcast on Sunday evenings on longwave only.

Between 17 January 1991 and 2 March 1991 FM broadcasts were replaced by a continuous news service devoted to the Gulf War, Radio 4 News FM, with the main Radio 4 service transferring to long wave.

In September 1991 the main Radio 4 service transferred from long wave to FM coverage had now extended to cover almost all of the UK - Radio 4 did not become available on FM in much of Scotland and Wales until the early 1990s. Opt-outs were transferred to longwave: currently Test Match Special, extra shipping forecasts, The Daily Service and Yesterday in Parliament. Longwave very occasionally opts out at other times, such as to broadcast special services, the most recent being when Pope Benedict XVI visited Britain in 2010.

Programmes and schedules

Daily schedule 
An online schedule page lists the running order of programmes.

Production 
Many programmes are pre-recorded. Programmes transmitted live include Today, magazine programme Woman's Hour, consumer affairs programme You and Yours, and (often) the music, film, books, arts and culture programme Front Row. Continuity is managed from Broadcasting House with news bulletins, including the hourly summaries and longer programmes such as the Six O'Clock News and Midnight News, and news programmes such as Today, The World at One and PM, which by early 2013 had returned to Broadcasting House after 15 years at BBC Television Centre in White City. The news returning to Broadcasting House has also meant that newsreaders can provide cover for continuity, which regularly occurs at 23:00 each night and 16:00 on a Sunday. This has reduced the total number of continuity announcers required each day down from four to three.

The Greenwich Time Signal, popularly known as "the pips", is broadcast every hour to herald the news bulletin, except at midnight and 18:00, and 22:00 on Sunday, when the chimes of Big Ben are played. There is no Greenwich Time Signal at 15:00 on Saturday or 10:00 and 11:00 on Sunday due to the Saturday Afternoon drama and the omnibus edition of The Archers respectively. Only pips broadcast on FM, MW and LW are accurate. On digital platforms there is a delay of between three and five seconds, and up to 23 seconds online.

Programmes 

Radio 4 programmes cover a wide variety of genre including news and current affairs, history, culture, science, religion, arts, drama and light entertainment. A number of the programmes on Radio 4 take the form of a "magazine" show, featuring numerous small contributions over the course of the programme—Woman's Hour, From Our Own Correspondent, You and Yours. The rise of these magazine shows is primarily due to the work of Tony Whitby, controller of Radio 4 from 1970 to 1975. The station hosts a number of long-running programmes, many of which have been broadcast for over 40 years.

Most programmes are available for four weeks after broadcast as streaming audio from Radio 4's listen again page and via BBC Sounds. A selection of programmes is also available as podcasts or downloadable audio files. Many comedy and drama programmes from the Radio 4 archives are broadcast on BBC Radio 4 Extra.
Due to the capacity limitations of DAB and increasing sport broadcasts on BBC Radio 5 Live Sports Extra, BBC Radio 4 DAB has to reduce its bit rate most evenings, such that after 7 p.m. its DAB output is usually in mono, even though many of its programmes are made in stereo (including its flagship drama "The Archers"), these can be heard in stereo only on FM, Digital TV on Freeview & Freesat (Ch. 704), Sky, Virgin and on line via BBC Sounds. BBC World Service, which uses BBC Radio 4 FM & DAB frequencies between 01:00 and 05:20, is in stereo, but only on Radio 4 FM & DAB and not on its own dedicated DAB channel. BBC Radio 4 Extra broadcasts in mono on DAB, but has always been in stereo on Digital TV (Freeview / Freesat Ch 708), Sky, Virgin and online.

Notable continuity announcers and newsreaders 
Announcers carry out the following duties from Broadcasting House:
 Provide links (or junctions) between programmes
 Read trails for programmes
 Provide reassurance to listeners during a programme breakdown
 Read the Shipping Forecast (except the 05:20 broadcast, which is covered by BBC Weather)
 Read the BBC Radio 3 news summaries at 13:00, 17:00 and 18:00 on weekdays

Newsreaders read hourly summaries and longer bulletins from New Broadcasting House. In 2012 the BBC announced that it would be reducing its main presentation team from 12 to ten.

BBC 

 Alan Smith
 John Hammond
 Caroline Nicholls

 Tom Sandars
 Jane Steel

Freelance 

Chris Aldridge
 Andrew Crawford
 Mark Forrest
 Jim Lee

 Andrew Peach
 Susan Rae
 Neil Nunes

Former 

 Alice Arnold (1994–2012)
 Carolyn Brown (left 2015)
 Harriet Cass (left 2013)
 Corrie Corfield (1988–2021)
 Peter Donaldson (1973–2012)
 Charlotte Green (1988–2013)
 Peter Jefferson (left 2009)
 Astley Jones (left 2006)
 Laurie Macmillan (died 2001)
 Rory Morrison (died 2013)
 Charles Nove (left 2019; now with Scala Radio)
 Jamie Owen
 Brian Perkins
 Iain Purdon (retired from BBC World Service in 2016)
 Vaughan Savidge (left 2018)
 Neil Sleat (1998-2021)
 Zeb Soanes (left 2022)
 Moira Stuart (left 1981 to move to TV; now with Classic FM)

Frequencies and other means of reception

Criticisms
Criticism voiced by centre-right newspapers in recent years have a perceived left political bias across a range of issues, as well as sycophancy in interviews, particularly on the popular morning news magazine Today as part of a reported perception of a general "malaise" at the BBC. Conversely, the journalist Mehdi Hasan has criticised the station for an overtly "socially and culturally conservative" approach.

There has been criticism of Today in particular for a lack of female broadcasters. In September 1972, Radio 4 employed the first female continuity announcers—Hylda Bamber and Barbara Edwards. For quite some time, the introduction of female newsreaders led to complaints from listeners; women discussing topics of feminist interest led to similar complaints. In addition, there has been long-running criticism by atheist and humanist groups of Thought for the Day, a slot dedicated exclusively to religious discussion during Radio 4's flagship morning news programme.

Radio 4 has been criticised for being too middle class and of little interest to non-white listeners.

See also 
 ABC Radio National
 CBC Radio One - Canadian talk radio station from CBC
 List of BBC newsreaders and reporters
 National Public Radio
 Radio New Zealand National
 RTÉ Radio 1 - Irish talk and music radio station from RTÉ
 Sveriges Radio P1

References

Further reading

External links 

 
4
News and talk radio stations in the United Kingdom
Radio stations established in 1967
1967 establishments in the United Kingdom
Radio stations in the United Kingdom
Longwave radio stations
Peabody Award winners
Podcasting companies